= Social Fund for Development (Egypt) =

Organization based in Egypt

Social Fund for Development (Egypt) was established in 1991 by a Presidential decree # 189 and with support of the United Nations Development Programme. SFD was created with a capital of 1.1 Billion Egyptian Pounds to alleviate the hardship created by the returning Egyptian workers from the Gulf area as a result of the First Gulf War. According to Magdy Moussa, Middle East Regional Director at Plant Finance, "SFD was regarded as a social safety net associated with the Government of Egypt's agreement to undertake its extensive Economic Reform and Structural Adjustment Program." SFD focuses on sustainable development projects. Also according to Moussa, a prominent focal point for SFD is promoting self-employment through microcredit projects.

Major donors are: the World Bank, the European Union, Germany, JICA, Kuwaiti Development Fund.
